A Ducking They Did Go is a 1939 short subject directed by Del Lord starring American slapstick comedy team The Three Stooges (Moe Howard, Larry Fine and Curly Howard). It is the 38th entry in the series released by Columbia Pictures starring the comedians, who released 190 shorts for the studio between 1934 and 1959.

Plot
While looking for work, the Stooges botch an attempt to steal a watermelon from a deliveryman (Cy Schindell), which lands them in trouble with a cop (William Irving). The trio winds up at the offices of the Canvas Back Duck Club, a hunting organization run by conmen Blackie (Lynton Brent) and Doyle (Jack Gardner), where they are promptly hired to sell club memberships.  Unfortunately, unbeknownst to them, the whole thing is a scam. Dressed in duck-hunting gear, Moe, Larry and Curly invade the police station and barge right into the office of the police chief (Bud Jamison) and somehow manage to sell memberships to several men, including the police chief and even the mayor.

By the time the group arrives at the lodge, the "club owners" are long gone, and an old man (John Rand) assures them that there are no ducks to be found. In a panic, Moe and Larry try to solve this dilemma by hurling decoy ducks and rubber decoys over the pond. Curly arrives at last with a large flock of ducks (à la the Pied Piper of Hamelin) and leads them into the water. Eventually, the old man (who the Stooges met earlier) shows up (with the local sheriff (Sam Lufkin)) telling the cops, the governor and the mayor that Curly has stolen all of his prize domestic ducks and it will cost them $5.00 apiece to replace each duck. The hunters realize they have been swindled and they, the old man and the sheriff with him are angry and shoot their guns at the Stooges, who flee the scene.

Production notes
Filmed on November 15–18, 1938, the title A Ducking They Did Go is a play on the old children's song "A-Hunting We Will Go."

The closing shot of the Stooges leaping over a bush and landing on a trio of bucking steers was reused from the end of 1936's A Pain in the Pullman.

References

External links 
 
 

1939 films
1939 comedy films
American black-and-white films
Films directed by Del Lord
The Three Stooges films
Columbia Pictures short films
Films about ducks
American slapstick comedy films
1930s English-language films
1930s American films